Laportea urentissima is a species of plant in the family Urticaceae. It is found in China and Vietnam. It is threatened by habitat loss.

References

urentissima
Endangered plants
Flora of China
Flora of Vietnam
Taxonomy articles created by Polbot